Nong Ki is the westernmost district (amphoe) of Buriram province, northeastern Thailand. The district lies approximately 80 km southwest of Buriram City.

Geography
Neighbouring districts are (from the northeast clockwise) Nong Hong, Chamni, Nang Rong, Non Suwan of Buriram Province, Soeng Sang, Khon Buri, and Nong Bun Mak of Nakhon Ratchasima province.

History
The minor district (king amphoe) was created on 1 March 1974, when the three tambons Nong Ki, Yoei Prasat, and Mueang Phai were split off from Nang Rong district. It was upgraded to a full district on 12 April 1977.

Motto
The Nong Ki District's motto is "The city of boxer, delicious grilled chicken, beautiful silk, rich of culture, and nature of Huai Yang Dam and Tung Kra Ten Reservoirs."

Administration
The district is divided into 10 sub-districts (tambons), which are further subdivided into 123 villages (mubans). Nong Ki is a township (thesaban tambon) which covers parts of tambons Nong Ki, Thung Kratat Phatthana, and Thung Kraten. There are also 10 tambon administrative organizations (TAO).

Notable people
Namphon Nongkee Pahuyuth, Muay Thai fighter
Namkabuan Nongkee Pahuyuth, Muay Thai fighter

References

External links
amphoe.com (Thai)
 

Nong Ki